Charles Quackenbush is an American former politician and Florida law enforcement officer. A Republican, he served as Insurance Commissioner of California from 1995–2000 and as a California State Assemblyman representing the 22nd District, from 1986–1994.

Background and political career 
Quackenbush was born on April 20, 1954 in Tacoma, Washington. As a child, he grew up in a military family and after graduating University of Notre Dame on a full ROTC scholarship, he joined the United States Army and rose to the rank of Captain as a helicopter pilot.  In 1982, he left the military to join the family business in Silicon Valley.  He was elected as a Republican to the California Assembly in 1986.

In 1994 he was elected insurance commissioner, effectively applying considerable campaign contributions from various insurance companies. He won re-election in 1998.

Resignation 
Note: For a timeline of the events associated with this section see
In early 2000, Cindy Ossias, then a senior lawyer for the California Department of Insurance
(CDI), charged the Department with corruption. According to testimony by CDI employees, including Ossias and staff attorney Robert Hagedorn, Commissioner Quackenbush and his top aides abused their positions for personal gain and acted against consumers' interests for many years.

After the 1994 Northridge earthquake, it was alleged that Quackenbush allowed insurance companies to compensate their clients much less than the actual damages. In exchange, the insurance companies set up special "educational funds". Those funds were used to create television commercials in which Quackenbush appeared as a basketball referee with Shaquille O'Neal in a Los Angeles Lakers uniform.  While couched as public service announcements, suspicions rose that main idea behind the commercials was to increase Quackenbush's name identification, which is critical for electoral success in California statewide races.
In addition to the educational funds, those same insurance companies contributed to his wife's unsuccessful 1998 assembly campaign, as well as his children's football camps.

Initially, Ossias blew the whistle as an anonymous source. When her identity was revealed, Quackenbush put her on an administrative leave for violation of attorney client privilege. On June 28, 2000, he announced his resignation (to become effective on July 10).

In February 2002, an 18-month investigation conducted by federal, state and Sacramento County prosecutors ended with prosecutors declining to press charges against Quackenbush, as they felt the evidence was not strong enough.

 Life after insurance commissioner 
After resigning as California's insurance commissioner, Quackenbush moved to Hawaii, where he was "doing political and military intelligence consulting". Quackenbush then moved to Florida and in 2005 became a sheriff's deputy in Lee County, Florida.

In 2007 he was suspended for accepting free food.

While working as a sheriff's deputy in February 2008, Quackenbush shot and critically wounded a suspect who was reported as resisting arrest. He was placed on paid leave during the investigation of the shooting, a standard practice for the agency.

In September 2016, he resigned, after making several racially controversial Facebook postings. At the time of his resignation from the Sheriff's Department, he also served as the vice-chair of the Lee County Republican Executive Committee and his wife was running for the Lee County school board.

 References 

External links
 The Downfall of California’s Insurance Commissioner, Insurance Journal'', July 2000

 

Living people
American people of Dutch descent
University of Notre Dame alumni
United States Army officers
United States Army aviators
Republican Party members of the California State Assembly
California Insurance Commissioners
American deputy sheriffs
1954 births
Hawaii Republicans
Florida Republicans